V. K. Chinnasamy is an Indian politician and former Member of the Legislative Assembly of Tamil Nadu. He was elected to the Tamil Nadu legislative assembly as an Anna Dravida Munnetra Kazhagam candidate from Bhavanisagar constituency in 1977, 1984 and 1991 elections and as an Anna Dravida Munnetra Kazhagam (Jayalalitha) candidate in 1989 election.

References 

All India Anna Dravida Munnetra Kazhagam politicians
Living people
India MPs 1998–1999
Lok Sabha members from Tamil Nadu
People from Tiruppur district
Year of birth missing (living people)
Tamil Nadu MLAs 1977–1980
Tamil Nadu MLAs 1985–1989
Tamil Nadu MLAs 1989–1991
Tamil Nadu MLAs 1991–1996
Tamil Nadu politicians